Mark Plumbley from Queen Mary University of London, UK was named Fellow of the Institute of Electrical and Electronics Engineers (IEEE) in 2015 for contributions to latent variable analysis.

References

Fellow Members of the IEEE
Living people
Year of birth missing (living people)
Place of birth missing (living people)